The St. Lucie High School (also known as the Fort Pierce Elementary School) is a historic school in Fort Pierce, Florida. It is located at 1100 Delaware Avenue. On January 26, 1984, it was added to the U.S. National Register of Historic Places. The building was first called Fort Pierce High School. For many years it had been the only high school between Stuart and Melbourne. Originally designed by W.B. Camp, at one point it had been "the most magnificent, the most modernly planned and the most architecturally beautiful public school building in Florida." As the school grew, architects such as William Hatcher and Laurence Funke made additions in 1926 closely following the original construction.

The building now houses the Fort Pierce Magnet School of the Arts, which offers an interdisciplinary curriculum that features music, art, dance and drama for elementary and middle school students.

References

External links

 Fort Pierce Magnet School of the Arts - official site
 St. Lucie County listings at National Register of Historic Places
 Florida's Office of Cultural and Historical Programs
 St. Lucie County listings
 Fort Pierce Magnet School of the Arts

National Register of Historic Places in St. Lucie County, Florida
Schools in St. Lucie County, Florida